Minnesota State Highway 114 (MN 114) is a  highway in west-central Minnesota, which runs from its intersection with State Highways 28 and 29 in Starbuck and continues north to its northern terminus at its interchange with Interstate 94/US Highway 52 near the city of Alexandria.

Route description
Highway 114 serves as a north–south route in west-central Minnesota between Starbuck, Lowry, and La Grand Township near Alexandria.

Highway 114 parallels State Highway 29 throughout its route.  Highway 114 also intersects with Highway 29 at its southern terminus in Starbuck.

The route runs concurrent briefly with State Highway 55 on the northern edge of Lowry.

The route is legally defined as Route 208 in the Minnesota Statutes. It is not marked with this number.

History
Highway 114 was authorized on April 22, 1933.

The highway originally served the city of Garfield, per its legal definition. When U.S. 52 was replaced by I-94, Highway 114 was truncated to end at the interstate.

By 1960, Highway 114 was paved between Highways 28 / 29 at Starbuck and State Highway 27 at La Grand Township.  The route is completely paved today.

Major intersections

References

114
Transportation in Pope County, Minnesota
Transportation in Douglas County, Minnesota